The 2010 Sporting Challenger was a professional tennis tournament played on outdoor red clay courts. This was the ninth edition of the tournament which is part of the Tretorn SERIE+ of the 2010 ATP Challenger Tour. It took place in Turin, Italy between 28 June and 4 July 2010.

Singles main draw entrants

Seeds

 Rankings are as of June 21, 2010.

Other entrants
The following players received wildcards into the singles main draw:
  Flavio Cipolla
  Thomas Fabbiano
  Alessandro Giannessi
  Potito Starace

The following players received entry from the qualifying draw:
  Alberto Brizzi
  Gianluca Naso
  Pedro Sousa
  Matteo Viola

The following players received lucky loser spots:
  Charles-Antoine Brézac
  João Sousa

Champions

Singles

 Simone Bolelli def.  Potito Starace 7–6(7), 6–2

Doubles

 Carlos Berlocq /  Frederico Gil def.  Daniele Bracciali /  Potito Starace 6–3, 7–6(5)

References
Official website

Sporting Challenger
Sporting Challenger
Sporting Challenger
Sporting Challenger
Sporting Challenger
Clay court tennis tournaments